Arizona Medical Training Institute (AMTI) is a private, vocational healthcare institute located in Mesa, Arizona. They provide entry-level medical training for students seeking careers in nursing, clinical laboratory science and the assisted living career fields.

Academic programs
 Certified Nursing Assistant (CNA)
 Phlebotomy Technician
 Medical Laboratory Assistant (MLA)
 Patient Care Technician
 Certified Caregiver
 Assisted Living Facility Manager
 CPR
 First Aide
 Continuing Education for Assisted Living Caregivers and Managers

References

External links
Arizona Medical Training Institute
American Medical Technologists

Medical schools in Arizona
Private universities and colleges in Arizona